John Leonard Orr (born April 26, 1949) is an American former firefighter, novelist, and convicted arsonist and mass murderer. Orr was a fire captain and arson investigator for the Glendale Fire Department in Southern California. He was convicted of serial arson and four counts of murder. In the 1980s and 1990s, Los Angeles was plagued by a series of fires that cost millions of dollars in damages and claimed four lives. Orr was found to be the cause of those fires. During his arson spree, Orr had several nicknames "The Pillow Pyro"  due to the location of the fires inside shops., the "Frito Bandito", and the "coin-tosser."

His modus operandi was to set fires using an incendiary timing device, usually comprising a lit cigarette with three matches wrapped in ruled yellow writing paper and secured by a rubber band, in stores while they were open and populated. He would also set small fires often in the grassy hills, in order to draw firefighters, leaving fires set in more congested areas unattended. He would then be part of the firefighting crew that investigated the fires.

Early life

Orr was born on April 26, 1949, in Los Angeles, California. He was one of three boys. His parents divorced when he was young. Following high school, Orr joined the US Air Force; in 1967, he shipped out for basic training, later transferring to Air Force firefighting school. He was stationed in Spain (where he went on to marry his high school girlfriend); in 1970, he was transferred to Montana. He was honorably discharged from the Air Force in April 1971. In reflecting on his time in the military, Orr later said he did not like his commanding officers. Orr returned to Los Angeles, where he applied to two police departments and two fire departments; while waiting to hear back, his wife gave birth to his daughter. Orr and his first wife divorced not long after. He was then invited to test for the LAPD. Orr passed all the tests except for those based on mental health, prompting the Police Department to send him a letter saying he was unsuitable. Orr was then accepted to test for the Los Angeles Fire Department; he went through the fire academy but struggled with both the written and physical test and was rejected. Desperate to be a firefighter, he applied to the Glendale Fire Department (at the time the Glendale FD was at the bottom in Los Angeles County for pay); he was accepted in 1974. Orr studied fire science at a local college and worked at a 7-Eleven and as store security at Sears part time. John earned a carry permit, applying and becoming an arson investigator, eventually attaining the rank of captain.

1984 South Pasadena fire
On October 10, 1984, in South Pasadena, California, a major fire broke out at an Ole's Home Center hardware store located in a shopping plaza. The store was completely destroyed by the fire, and four people were killed: a two-year-old child, the child's 50-year-old grandmother, a 26-year-old mother of two, and a 17-year-old employee. On the following day, arson investigators from around southern California converged on the destroyed store, and declared the cause to be an electrical fire. However, Orr, as an arson investigator, insisted that the cause was arson.

Orr was correct, of course, because he set the blaze. Speculation has been that he wanted his work to be recognized. Albeit anonymously. Investigations showed that the fire was deliberately started in highly flammable polyurethane products, which caught fire very quickly, causing the fire to flashover very rapidly. This, sadly, does not mean that the deaths of his 4 victims were rapid. Even at trial, Orr showed no remorse and an utter disregard for not only the lives he took, but the families he destroyed as well.

Investigation

In January 1987, a convention for arson investigators from California was held in the city of Fresno. During and after the convention, several suspicious fires were set in Bakersfield. This, combined with the recovery of a single unmatched fingerprint left on a piece of notebook paper as part of a time-delay incendiary device, led Captain Marvin G. Casey of the Bakersfield Fire Department (BFD) to suspect that an arson investigator from the Los Angeles area was responsible for these arsons.

During March 1989, another series of arsons were committed along the California coast in close conjunction with a conference of arson investigators in Pacific Grove, California. By comparing the list of attendees from the Fresno conference with the list of attendees at the Pacific Grove conference, Casey was able to create a short list of ten suspects. Orr was on Casey's short list, but everyone on this short list was cleared of suspicion when their fingerprints were compared with the fingerprint that Casey had recovered from the piece of notebook paper found at one of the arson crime scenes. Orr's fingerprint did not match.

In late 1990 and early 1991, another series of arson fires broke out in southern California, this time in and around the Los Angeles metropolitan area. As a result, a large task force, nicknamed the Pillow Pyro Task Force (a reference to the arson fires set in pillows) was formed to apprehend the arsonist. On March 29, 1991, Tom Campuzanno of the Los Angeles Arson Task Force circulated a flier at a meeting of the Fire Investigators Regional Strike Team (FIRST), an organization formed by a group of smaller cities in and around Los Angeles County that did not have their own staff of arson investigators. The flier described the modus operandi of the suspected serial arsonist in the Los Angeles area. Scott Baker of the California State Fire Marshal's Office was at that meeting, and told Campuzanno about the series of arsons investigated by Casey and about Casey's suspicions that the perpetrator was an arson investigator from the Los Angeles area. Consequently, Campuzanno and two of his colleagues met with Casey, obtained a copy of the fingerprint that Casey had recovered, and this time matched it to Orr on April 17, 1991, with the help of improved fingerprint technology. By cross-referencing the print with a database of all past applicants for law enforcement posts in Los Angeles County, they discovered that the print was an exact match to Orr's left ring finger.

Arrest
Orr was then investigated and watched for several months. Authorities hid a tracking device in his personal vehicle. While leaving a May 1991 fire conference in San Luis Obispo, California, he discovered the tracking device. Orr rushed to a nearby police explosives range, thinking it was a bomb. The police were alerted by FIRST, and Orr was told that the device was a hoax. Orr was never aware of a second tracking device installed in his city vehicle that November. His actions continued to be watched. After Orr was found to be present at another suspicious fire, a federal grand jury handed down an indictment. Orr was arrested on December 4, 1991 and was charged with arson for a series of fires not related to the 1984 South Pasadena Ole's fire.

After his arrest, arson investigators began a forensic re-evaluation of the Ole's fire. They found a highly detailed description of a similar fire in his novel Points of Origin which tells the story of a fireman who is also a serial arsonist. The book chronicles acts of arson and bears several striking similarities with the real-life 1984 fire. When questioned, Orr stated the novel is a work of fiction and has no relation to any actual events. Defending his manuscript, Orr expressly stated: "The character of Aaron Stiles was a composite of arsonists I arrested."

Trial and conviction
Among those who covered the trial was award-winning journalist Frank Girardot, who would later collaborate with Orr's daughter Lori on a book about the case. After much deliberation, a federal jury in Fresno convicted Orr on July 31, 1992 of three counts of arson, while acquitting him on two other counts. Federal Judge Oliver Wanger sentenced Orr to 30 years in prison. Orr maintains his innocence, notwithstanding his subsequent guilty plea on March 24, 1993, to three more counts of arson in Los Angeles after reaching a plea agreement that saw him paroled from federal prison in 2002. He took the plea deal when it became apparent that he could not afford to mount a defense and stood little chance at trial.

By November 21, 1994, state prosecutors in Los Angeles indicted Orr on four counts of first-degree murder with special circumstances and 21 counts of arson for a string of fires stretching from 1984 to 1990. The lead prosecutor on the case, Mike Cabral, opted to seek the death penalty in order to ensure that Orr would spend the rest of his life in prison. He made an off-the-record offer to Orr: if Orr accepted a sentence of life without parole and confessed all of his acts of arson in open court dating to his youth, Cabral would take the death penalty off the table. Orr turned the offer down out of hand.

A jury in a California state court convicted Orr on all four murder charges and all but one of the arson counts on June 25, 1998. That arson count, for setting a fire in the Warner Bros. backlot, was subsequently dismissed at the request of the prosecution. When asked to sentence Orr to the death penalty, the same jury split eight to four in favor. The presiding judge sentenced Orr to four concurrent terms of life without parole for murder, plus an additional 21 years in prison for arson. The state sentence ran consecutively with his federal sentence for arson.

A California appeals court vacated nine years of his state sentence on March 15, 2000, finding that the burning of homes in the College Hills blaze had only been incidental to his objective of starting a brush fire. It left the remainder of the sentence untouched, all but assuring that Orr will die in prison. Orr began his state sentence upon his release from federal custody in 2002. Orr is currently serving his life sentence at California State Prison, Centinela. His name does not appear in the California Department of Corrections inmate database, suggesting that he is being held under an alias.

Aftermath
Some arson investigators and an FBI criminal profiler have deemed Orr to be possibly one of the worst American serial arsonists of the 20th century. Federal ATF agent Mike Matassa believes that Orr set nearly 2,000 fires between 1984 and 1991. Furthermore, arson investigators determined that after Orr was arrested, the number of brush fires in the nearby foothill areas decreased by more than 90 percent.

Orr's daughter Lori, who later became a motivational speaker, testified on behalf of the defense at the trial and her testimony prevented him from receiving the death penalty. After maintaining her father's innocence for years, she eventually came to believe he was guilty and broke off all contact with him.

The story has been chronicled by bestselling true crime author Frank Girardot, who co-wrote a biography of Orr in collaboration with Orr's daughter, Lori Kovach, entitled Burned. Orr's story was earlier chronicled by bestselling true crime author Joseph Wambaugh in his book Fire Lover. Burned features several court documents, fresh interviews with Orr and never-before-revealed evidence. 

On several occasions, film and television have also presented the story of Orr's arson activities and eventual arrest and criminal conviction. An episode of the PBS science series Nova titled "Hunt for the Serial Arsonist" (airing November 14, 1995) chronicled his story. The investigation that led to Orr's arrest and conviction was recounted on the episode "Diary of a Serial Arsonist" of the A&E Network's true crime series Cold Case Files and also on an episode of Casefile True Crime Podcast. Most notably, a film titled Point of Origin, starring Ray Liotta as John Orr, was released by HBO in 2002; the film's title is a reference to Orr's novel. He was profiled in the 2004 Forensic Files episode "Point of Origin", the same title used in the HBO film. His story was recounted in 2019 on Investigation Discovery's Deadly Secrets in the episode "The Fire Inside", and Oxygen's A Lie To Die For in the episode "The Heat Of Deceit." A 2021 episode of HLNs Very Scary People featured him, titled "Firestarter: A Wall of Flames". He also was mentioned in the 12th episode of the second season of 9-1-1: Lone Star. In July 2021, truth.media released the true crime podcast Firebug, hosted by filmmaker Kary Antholis and chronicling the investigation into the fires through interviews and excerpts from Orr's manuscript.

Prison writing 
As part of Hamilton College's prison writing initiative, The American Prison Writing Archive, Orr was able to publish several autobiographical accounts of his experiences as a prisoner in the American prison complex.

References

American mass murderers
American people convicted of arson
American prisoners sentenced to life imprisonment
Prisoners sentenced to life imprisonment by California
American firefighters
Place of birth missing (living people)
People convicted of murder by California
American people convicted of murder
1949 births
Living people
American murderers of children
Writers from California